Haston may refer to:

 Dougal Haston (1940–1977), British mountaineer
 Jock Haston (1913–1986), British Trotskyist politician
 Kirk Haston (born 1979), American basketball player